The Glory Boys is a 1984 British three-part television thriller miniseries made for Yorkshire Television and first broadcast on the ITV network between 1 and 3 October 1984, starring Rod Steiger and Anthony Perkins. It is about two terrorists, one from the IRA and another from the PLO who meet up in London to assassinate an Israeli nuclear scientist.

Cast
Rod Steiger as Professor David Sokarev
Anthony Perkins as Jimmy
Alfred Burke as Jones
Joanna Lumley as Helen
Sallyanne Law as Norah
Aaron Harris as Cillian McCoy
Gary Brown as Famy

Production
Steiger and Perkins were at loggerheads during the production of The Glory Boys. Perkins resented the fact that Steiger insisted on a bigger trailer and felt that Steiger was trying to steal scenes from him, while Steiger had thought Perkins "so jittery and jinxed by the chemicals he was taking" that he felt sorry for him and believed that he was jeopardizing the success of the film.

References

Sources

External links
 

1984 British television series debuts
1984 British television series endings
ITV television dramas
British thriller films
1984 thriller films
1980s British television miniseries
Television series by ITV Studios
Television series by Yorkshire Television
1984 drama films
1980s British films